Johnathan McCarty (August 3, 1795 – March 30, 1852) was a U.S. Representative from Indiana.

Born in Culpeper County, Virginia, McCarty attended the public schools.
He moved to Indiana in 1803 with his father, who settled in Franklin County.
He engaged in mercantile pursuits.
He served as member of the State house of representatives in 1818.
He moved to Connersville, Indiana.
He served as clerk of the county court 1819–1827.

McCarty was elected as a Jacksonian to the Twenty-second and Twenty-third Congresses and reelected as an Anti-Jacksonian to the Twenty-fourth Congress (March 4, 1831 – March 3, 1837).
He was an unsuccessful candidate for reelection in 1836 to the Twenty-fifth Congress.
He served as presidential elector on the Whig ticket in 1840.
He moved to Keokuk, Iowa, where he died March 30, 1852.
He was interred in Oakland Cemetery.

References

1795 births
1852 deaths
People from Culpeper County, Virginia
Indiana Whigs
Indiana Democratic-Republicans
Members of the Indiana House of Representatives
Indiana National Republicans
Jacksonian members of the United States House of Representatives from Indiana
19th-century American politicians
National Republican Party members of the United States House of Representatives
1840 United States presidential electors
People from Connersville, Indiana
People from Keokuk, Iowa